The 1928 Bluefield Big Blue football team was an American football team that represented the Bluefield Institute (now known as Bluefield State College) during the 1927 college football season. In its third season under head coach Harry R. Jefferson, the team compiled an 8–0–1 record. Bluefield became known as the "Wonder Team" and was recognized as the 1928 black college national champion. The team played its home games in the Beceye Bowl in Bluefield, West Virginia.

Quarterback Herbert Cain was selected as captain of the 1927 colored All-America team.  Jimmie Moore was the team's line coach.

Schedule

References

Bluefield
Bluefield State Big Blues football seasons
Black college football national champions
College football undefeated seasons
Bluefield Big Blue football